The 1999 Giro d'Italia was the 82nd edition of the Giro d'Italia, one of cycling's Grand Tours. The Giro began in Agrigento, with a flat stage on 15 May, and Stage 12 occurred on 26 May with a stage from Cesenatico. The race finished in Milan on 6 June.

Stage 12
26 May 1999 — Cesenatico to Sassuolo,

Stage 13
27 May 1999 — Sassuolo to Rapallo,

Rest day
28 May 1999

Stage 14
29 May 1999 — Bra to Borgo San Dalmazzo,

Stage 15
30 May 1999 — Racconigi to Santuario di Oropa,

Stage 16
31 May 1999 — Biella to Lumezzane,

Stage 17
1 June 1999 — Lumezzane to Castelfranco Veneto,

Stage 18
2 June 1999 — Treviso to Treviso,  (ITT)

Stage 19
3 June 1999 — Castelfranco Veneto to Alpe di Pampeago,

Stage 20
4 June 1999 — Predazzo to Madonna di Campiglio,

Stage 21
5 June 1999 — Madonna di Campiglio to Aprica,

Stage 22
6 June 1999 — Darfo Boario Terme to Milan,

References

1999 Giro d'Italia
Giro d'Italia stages